USS LST-382 was a  in the United States Navy during World War II. She was later sold to France as La Paillotte (LST-382).

Construction and career 
LST-382 was laid down on 10 December 1942 at Bethlehem Steel Co., Quincy, Massachusetts. Launched on 3 February 1943 and commissioned on 18 February 1943.

Service in the United States 
During World War II, LST-382 was assigned to the Europe-Africa-Middle East theater. She took part in the Invasion of Sicilian from 9 to 15 July 1943 and the Salerno landings from 9 to 21 September 1943.

She participated in the Invasion of Normandy from 6 to 25 June 1944.

LST-382 was decommissioned on 29 December 1944 and transferred to the Royal Navy.

She was struck from the Navy Register on 28 April 1949.

Service in the United Kingdom 
HMS LST-382 was commissioned on 18 December 1944 and was part of W Task Force which participated in the invasion of Malaya.

She was returned to the United States n 1946 and leased to France on 23 January 1948.

Service in France 
She was transferred to the French Navy and commissioned on 23 January 1948 with the same name LST-382.

In 1950s, she was given the name La Paillotte (LST-347).

La Paillotte took part in the First Indochina War between 19 December 1946 to 1 August 1954.

The ship was out of service and sold for scrap.

Awards 
LST-382 have earned the following awards:

American Campaign Medal
Europe-Africa-Middle East Campaign Medal (3 battle stars)
World War II Victory Medal

Citations

Sources 
 
 
 
 

 

World War II amphibious warfare vessels of the United States
World War II amphibious warfare vessels of the United Kingdom
Ships built in Quincy, Massachusetts
1943 ships
LST-1-class tank landing ships of the United States Navy
LST-1-class tank landing ships of the Royal Navy
Ships transferred from the United States Navy to the French Navy